Lunk is a pejorative for a fool or idiot, a mindless golem.

Lunk can also refer to:

 In reality
 An arenavirus (LNKV).
 Lunk, a nickname for Steve Lundquist an Olympic swimmer
 A lunk alarm when Planet Fitness gymgoers make too much noise.
 Lunk, a breed of guinea pigs developed in Sweden.

 In fiction
 Jim "Lunk" Austin, a character in Robotech.
 Lunk, an evil alien in PlayStation Move Heroes.
 Big Lunk, a role of played by Jody McCrea in Pajama Party.
 Lunk, an enemy in Bulletman.
 Lunk, a Frosticon in Mixels.
 Jim "Lunk" Austin, a maintenance mechanic in Genesis Climber MOSPEADA.
 Lunk Johnson, alias for Lenny Juliano in Cheerleader Massacre.
 Lunk, a role played by John DiMaggio in Generator Rex.
 Sgt. Lunk played by Noel Cravat in The 5,000 Fingers of Dr. T.
 Lunk, a character in Ribbit King.
 Lunk, a character in "Two of A Kind" episode in Catscratch.
 'Lunk' Boxwell played by Mike Mazurki in He's a Cockeyed Wonder.
 Grubber (Lunk) voiced by Peter New in Powerpuff Girls Z
 Lunk Nelson, played by Christian Rub in Father's Son
 Lunk played by Enzo Junior in Preaching to the Perverted.
 Lunk voiced by Nolan North in Teenage Mutant Ninja Turtles (2012 TV series).
 Lunk, a Silversnow Knight in The Secrets of Droon.
 The Incredible Lunk, an episode of The Kwicky Koala Show.
 Wieb Lunk played by Brian Regan in episode "Spread Those Wings and Fly" of The Looney Tunes Show.
 Lunk, a character in Space Brat
 Lunk Johnson playing Buzzy in Massacre (franchise).
 Parson Calverton Lunk played by Spencer Charters in In Person.
 Felix Lunk played by Brooklyn Keller in The Fires of Conscience.
 Ben Grimm, also known as the Lunk, in normalman
 Hans Lünk played by Fritz Genschow in Street Music (1936 film).
 "Lunk's Awakening", an episode of The Cyanide & Happiness Show.
 Lunk, a character in Doglands.